Steve Brown (born 2 June 1981) is a television presenter, public speaker and athlete mentor as well as a former member and captain of the Great Britain wheelchair rugby squad.

Early life 
Brown was raised in a family that supported Crystal Palace Football Club and was inspired by them. He attended Borden Grammar School in Sittingbourne, Kent and represented the school in football, cricket and cross-country.

Alongside his sport, Brown's greatest pleasure was in exploring the countryside around his home. His interest was so great that he wanted to be a wildlife presenter. "If I wasn't playing football with my mates I was catching tadpoles and slowworms, and I loved programmes like The Really Wild Show and everything with David Attenborough. So that’s what I wanted to be. But the careers master just told me I wouldn't be able to do that and to forget it."

Injury and recovery 
At the age of 23, Brown fell from a first-floor balcony while working in Europe as an area manager for a holiday company. He recounts: "I tripped and fell from a first-floor balcony. I was looking up when I landed, so when my body stopped my head went back over my shoulders, like a severe whiplash. It snapped my neck, dislocating the C7 [one of the cervical vertebra, below the skull] and trapping my spinal cord." Very soon after arriving at Stoke Mandeville Hospital, Brown was taken to watch wheelchair rugby.

Wheelchair rugby 

Brown's potential in the sport was quickly noted by the head coach of the Great Britain squad. In 2006, he was awarded a place in that squad and in 2007 he was part of the team that won gold in the IWRF European Championships.

Despite such precocious progress, Brown narrowly missed selection for the 2008 Beijing Paralympic Games - but was honoured to lead the Olympic and Paralympic Parade of the Heroes through London on the team's return.

Omission from the squad for Beijing only maximised Brown's determination to play at Great Britain's home Paralympics in 2012. He regained his place and, despite breaking his sternum while playing in Germany in 2010, was awarded the captaincy in 2011. At the London 2012 Paralympics, Brown led his team to a 5th-place finish. He has since commented that “Being captain at your home Games is the biggest thing that you could do. I was incredibly proud.”

Although Brown retired from international sport after the London 2012 games, he remains heavily involved in wheelchair rugby as a player and the head coach for Canterbury Hellfire Wheelchair Rugby Club. He is one of the most recognised faces in the sport, having featured in multiple national newspapers and television broadcasts including Channel 4's Inside Incredible Athletes.

Television 
Since 2012, Brown has become increasingly present on television for a variety of channels and in a variety of roles. He has presented for the BBC's Truth or Scare, The One Show and Springwatch. He has also been a roving reporter for Game Changers on Sky Sports.

From 12 to 16 October 2015, he joined the ITV team for the live broadcast of the BT World Wheelchair Rugby Challenge at the Copper Box Arena in the Queen Elizabeth Olympic Park. He co-presented from the courtside studio as a pundit alongside Martin Bayfield, the former England and British & Irish Lions rugby union player.

Brown worked as a reporter and commentator for the BBC's coverage of the Invictus Games in 2014, 2016 and 2017. He has described this work as "the privilege of watching people bond and go from being individuals with things in common to being part of a team." In September 2016, he was a member of the Channel 4 team that brought coverage of the Rio 2016 Paralympic Games.

In April 2017, Brown became the latest member of the BBC's Countryfile team. For him this was the realisation of a long-held ambition and a refutation of the careers advisor at school who told him that he would never be a wildlife presenter. He remarked that "[i]t is worth every flat tyre, every muddy set of hands, every wet lap… I want to be judged on my performance. I'm hoping people will see it's about ability, not disability.” He has presented Escape to the Perfect Town, a spin-off to Escape to the Country.

Other work 
Brown is a Sky Sports Scholar and a Sky Sports 'Living for Sport' mentor, as well as a public speaker who has spoken for organisations including Allianz and Sky. His charitable work includes being an ambassador for Wooden Spoon, a patron of Panathlon and a trustee for the Swale Youth Development Fund.

References

External links
 Official Site
 Paralympics GB

1981 births
Living people
Paralympic wheelchair rugby players of Great Britain
Wheelchair rugby players at the 2012 Summer Paralympics
Television presenters with disabilities